

Telephones 

Telephones - main lines in use:
7,300 (2012)

Telephones - mobile cellular:
17,150 (2012)

Telephone system:
domestic:
Palau National Communications Company
international:
satellite earth station - 1 Intelsat (Pacific Ocean)

Radio and television 
Radio broadcast stations:
AM 1, FM 3, shortwave 1 (2002)
List of radio stations in Palau

Radios:
12,000 (1997)

Television broadcast stations:
None, cable and satellite networks provide television service.

Televisions:
11,000 (1997)

Internet 
Internet Service Providers (ISPs):
PNCC (Formally PalauNet)

Country code (Top level domain): PW

References

 
Palau
Palau